Silvana Mayara Cardoso Fernandes (born 23 April 1999) is a Brazilian para taekwondo practitioner. She will compete at the 2020 Summer Paralympics in the –58 kg category.

References

External links
 

1999 births
Living people
Brazilian female taekwondo practitioners
Paralympic taekwondo practitioners of Brazil
Taekwondo practitioners at the 2020 Summer Paralympics
Paralympic bronze medalists for Brazil
Paralympic medalists in taekwondo
Medalists at the 2020 Summer Paralympics
21st-century Brazilian women